Southern Pacific Railroad (SP) 2355 is one of 10 heavy 4-6-0 'Ten Wheel' steam locomotives built by Baldwin Locomotive Works in 1912, designated the T-31 class. 2355 was retired from service in 1957 and was converted to a static display at Pioneer Park in Mesa, Arizona.

The locomotive was fenced off for safety concerns in the 1990s. Since 2008, efforts have been underway to relocate 2355 within Pioneer Park and perform cosmetic restoration. Restoring the locomotive to a running state from its current condition is deemed to be cost-prohibitive.

Southern Pacific 2355 has one surviving sibling. Southern Pacific 2353 is on static display in Campo, California's Pacific Southwest Railway Museum. 

Southern Pacific 2355 still sits where it was left in Pioneer Park. It was not relocated.  The locomotive and tender have undergone a complete cosmetic restoration.  Asbestos material and lead-based paint have been removed.  Its paint was stripped completely using an environmentally-friendly blasting material.  Polyurethane paint was applied and the train's electronics have been updated.  Informational, interactive signage has been installed along with a completely new lighting arrangement.  Cab control restorations continue.  There also plans to mount plaques listing all the donors and persons helping with the train's restoration.

References 

2355
Baldwin locomotives
4-6-0 locomotives
Individual locomotives of the United States
Preserved steam locomotives of Arizona
Standard gauge locomotives of the United States
Railway locomotives introduced in 1912